West Carteret is an unincorporated community located within Carteret in Middlesex County, New Jersey, United States. Joseph Medwick Park is a greenway of parkland along the banks the Rahway River.

References

Carteret, New Jersey
Unincorporated communities in Middlesex County, New Jersey
Unincorporated communities in New Jersey